Infusion is the process of extracting chemical compounds or flavors from plant material in a solvent such as water, oil or alcohol, by allowing the material to remain suspended in the solvent over time (a process often called steeping). An infusion is also the name for the resultant liquid. The process of infusion is distinct from both decoction—a method of extraction involving boiling the plant material—and percolation, in which water is passed through the material (as in a coffeemaker).

History
The first recorded use of essential oils was in the 10th or 11th century by the Persian polymath Avicenna, possibly in The Canon of Medicine.

Tea is far older than this, dating back to the 10th century BC as the earliest recorded reference.

Preparation techniques
Infusion is a chemical process that uses botanicals (typically dried herbs, flowers or berries) that are volatile and release their active ingredients readily in water, oil, or alcohol. In this process, a liquid is typically boiled (or brought to another appropriate temperature) and poured over the herb.  After the herb has been allowed to steep in the liquid for an appropriate period of time, it is removed (possibly by straining) leaving an infusion. Unless the infusion is to be consumed immediately, it is bottled and refrigerated for future use.

The amount of time the herbs are left in the liquid depends on the kind of infusion. Infusion times can range from seconds (for some kinds of Chinese tea) to hours, days, or months (for liqueurs like Sloe Gin). 

The most commonly used technique is the teabag, which is made with filter paper and filled with various tea flavors.

Examples

 Tea is  a common example of an infusion; most varieties of tea call for steeping the leaves in hot water, although some variants (e.g. Moroccan mint tea) call for decoction instead. Many herbal teas are prepared by infusion, as well; lemon, chamomile, senna, apple, ginger, rooibos, and many other plants are used individually or in combination.
 Coffee can also be made through infusion (as in a French press), but is more often made through percolation.
 Herbal remedies are commonly produced through infusions in water or oil.
 Flavored oils: Plants with desirable flavors may be steeped in an edible oil or vinegar for an extended period; the infused oil or vinegar is often sold still containing the plant and is then used as flavoring. Chilis, lemon, garlic, and many other plants may be used. There can be ambiguity in the labeling of these oils: for example, what is described as sesame oil may be oil extracted from sesame seeds or another vegetable oil infused with sesame.
 Cucumber water, a mix of sliced cucumber with citrus slices and herbs such as mint, is a popular infusion. It is sometimes known as "spa water" due to it being commonly served in day spas and similar personal care establishments.

See also

 Mate
 Aromatherapy
 Chinese herbology
 Decoction
 Herbalism
 List of cooking techniques
 Tincture
 Maceration (food)
 Percolation

References

External links

 
 

Aromatherapy
Cooking techniques